Gilbert William Steer (June 20, 1928 – November 30, 2007) was a Canadian football player who played for the BC Lions and Calgary Stampeders. He also played football at the University of British Columbia.

References

1928 births
2007 deaths
BC Lions players
Calgary Stampeders players
Canadian football offensive linemen
Players of Canadian football from Saskatchewan
Sportspeople from Regina, Saskatchewan
UBC Thunderbirds football players